Face the Music is the fifth studio album by American boyband New Kids on the Block, released on January 25, 1994. The album debuted at number 37 on the Billboard 200 in the United States, with first-week sales of 27,000 copies. According to Nielsen SoundScan, the album had sold 138,000 copies in the U.S. as of 2008.

Background
In 1993, after about two years out of the limelight, the New Kids went back into the studio and began recording their fifrth studio album, before splitting up a year later. By this point, due to a strong backlash and allegations of lip-synching, the group pushed for a more mature image and song selection that would appeal to fans. In addition, they had outgrown the "New Kids" name: Joey McIntyre was 21, Jordan Knight was 23, Donnie Wahlberg and Danny Wood were 24, and Jonathan Knight was 25 years old.

Jordan Knight, Wahlberg, and Wood fought for creative input and control, as most of their material was previously rejected by producer Maurice Starr in favor of his own compositions. Having been dogged with an "uncool" stigma that they faced previously, the boys decided to sever their ties with Starr who had been instrumental in their early success. At the request of Columbia Records, they shortened their name to the more mature-sounding NKOTB. Instead of the bubblegum, teen pop sound that established the New Kids in the pop industry, Face the Music had a more mature R&B and New jack swing sound to it. The album
also included the track "Keep on Smilin" the group previously recorded for the film Free Willy, and it was also one of their first recordings since undergoing the name change. "Dirty Dawg" did fairly well on the charts, but a Canadian station (MuchMusic) banned the music video due to its suggested violence and misogynistic themes. Although not a major commercial success, the critical reception was positive, and a cross-country tour was in the works. However, NKOTB only could find bookings at nightclubs and theatres, a far cry from the arenas and stadiums they had been accustomed to playing in while in their peak years. During the tour, Jonathan Knight dropped out of the band due to increased panic attacks and anxiety, and the fact that their fanbase had grown up moved on to grunge and gangsta rap, the rest of the group decided to cancel the rest of the tour.

Singles
"If You Go Away" - December 14, 1991 (First released on greatest hits album H.I.T.S.)
"Dirty Dawg" - December 21, 1993
"Never Let You Go" - January 11, 1994

Track listing

Sample credits
"Intro: Face the Music" contains samples from "360 Degrees" by Grand Puba. It also embodies portions of "DWYCK" by Gang Starr featuring Nice & Smooth, and of "Take It Personal" by Gang Starr. 
"Dirty Dawg" contains a sample of "Papa Don't Take No Mess" by James Brown.
"Girls" contains a sample of "Girls, Girls, Girls" by Moments & Whatnauts.
"Let's Play House" contains a sample of "Around The Way Girl" by L.L. Cool J.
"I'll Be Waitin'" contains a sample of "Eric B Is President" by Eric B. & Rakim.

Notes
 signifies a remixer
 signifies an associate producer
 signifies a co-producer

Personnel
Adapted from the album's liner notes.

"Intro: Face the Music"
Lead vocals by Donnie Wahlberg

"You Got the Flavor"
Lead vocals by Jordan Knight
Rap by Donnie Wahlberg
Live Instrumentals by Teddy Riley

"Dirty Dawg"
Lead vocals by Jordan Knight
Rap by Nice & Smooth
Live Instrumentals & Background Vocals by Larry Thomas

"Girls"
Lead vocals by Jordan Knight
Rap by Donnie Wahlberg
Live Instrumentals by Teddy Riley

"If You Go Away"
Lead vocals by Jordan Knight and Joe McIntyre
Add Libs by Danny Wood

"Keep on Smilin'"
Lead vocals by Jordan Knight, Donnie Wahlberg, Danny Wood, and Joe McIntyre

"Never Let You Go"
Lead vocals by Jordan Knight
Rap by Donnie Wahlberg
Live Instrumentals by Teddy Riley

"Keepin' My Fingers Crossed"
Lead vocals by Jordan Knight
Rap by Donnie Wahlberg
Guitar & Keyboards by Richard Wolf
Drums & Programming by Greg Lawson and Darryl Swann

"Mrs. Right"
Lead vocals by Joe McIntyre
Live Instrumentals by Donnie Wahlberg and Larry Thomas
Scratches by Jeff Gamere

"Since You Walked into My Life"
Lead vocals by Jordan Knight and Joe McIntyre
Spoken by Danny Wood

"Let's Play House"
Lead vocals by Jordan Knight
Rap by Donnie Wahlberg

"I Can't Believe It's Over"
Lead vocals by Jordan Knight

"I'll Still Be Loving You"
Lead vocals by Joe McIntyre

"I'll Be Waitin'"
Lead vocals by Danny Wood and Joe McIntyre
Live Instrumentals by Dow Brain, Brad Young, and Danny Wood

Charts

References

1994 albums
New Kids on the Block albums
Columbia Records albums
Albums produced by Teddy Riley